Alexander Ray Torres (born September 15, 1987) is an American musician, best known for being the guitarist of metalcore and post-hardcore bands Eyes Set to Kill, Greeley Estates, Alesana and The Dead Rabbitts.

Career

Eyes Set to Kill (2006) 
Torres was one of the first three non-original members to join Eyes Set to Kill, as it was started as a three-piece. He recorded their first EP, When Silence Is Broken, The Night Is Torn.

Greeley Estates (2007–2010) 

Torres joined metalcore band Greeley Estates in April 2007, along with Joshua "Fergz" Ferguson. He recorded both Go West Young Man, Let the Evil Go East and No Rain, No Rainbow. On June 15, 2010, Greeley Estates officially announced that Torres had left the band, "abruptly" before their Japan tour, to "focus on other musical endeavors", and also announced that bassist David Ludlow would take over guitar and that Micah Kinard, the lead vocalist of Oh, Sleeper, would be filling in on bass. They have since added Kyle Kolesch to be permanent bassist.

Alesana (2010–2012) 
Almost immediately after he left Greeley Estates, Torres joined rock band Alesana when their guitarist, Jake Campbell, left the band to be with his family. Torres went through all of Warped Tour 2010 with Alesana and is included on the band's fourth studio album, A Place Where the Sun Is Silent. In 2012 Alex Torres left Alesana for medical reasons.

The Dead Rabbitts (2012–2015) 

Most recently Torres joined The Dead Rabbitts, replacing Kevin "Thrasher" Gruft. In November 2013, The Dead Rabbitts signed with Tragic Hero Records and announced that they will be releasing an album sometime in 2014. In December, they began recording songs with Andrew Wade, On May 16. the band released their first single "My Only Regret" from their debut album Shapeshifter, which was released on July 1, 2014. The album debuted at No. 127 on the Billboard 200. On November 7, the band released a music video of their song "Deer in the Headlights". During this time, Torres was also the touring bassist for Escape the Fate before Max Georgiev took over. In 2015, he left The Dead Rabbitts and was replaced by Boby Whitaker. He is currently working as a police officer.

Discography 
With Eyes Set to Kill
2006: When Silence Is Broken, the Night Is Torn (self-released)

With Greeley Estates
2008: Go West Young Man, Let the Evil Go East (Science Records)
2010: No Rain, No Rainbow (Tragic Hero Records)

With Alesana
2010: The Emptiness ( Epitaph Records)
2011: A Place Where the Sun Is Silent (Epitaph Records)

With Dead Rabbitts
2014: Shapeshifter  (Tragic Hero Records)

Videography 
With Greeley Estates
"Blue Morning"
"If She Only Knew"

With Alesana
"Circle VII: Sins of the Lion"
"Lullaby of the Crucified"

With the Dead Rabbitts
"Edge of Reality"
"Deer In the Headlights"

References 

Living people
1987 births
American rock guitarists
American male guitarists
Place of birth missing (living people)
People from Casa Grande, Arizona
Guitarists from Arizona
21st-century American guitarists
21st-century American male musicians